Spilarctia is a genus of moths in the family Erebidae. The genus was erected by Arthur Gardiner Butler in 1875.

Subgenus Spilarctia
accensa species group
Spilarctia accensa (Swinhoe, 1903)
Spilarctia ericsoni (Semper, 1899)
Spilarctia rhodochroa (Hampson, 1916)
Spilarctia rubriventris (Talbot, 1926)
ananda species group
Spilarctia ananda (Roepke, 1938)
Spilarctia groganae (Holloway, 1976)
Spilarctia irina Dubatolov, 2006
bisecta species group
Spilarctia bisecta (Leech, [1889])
Spilarctia graminivora Inoue, 1988
Spilarctia lungtani Daniel, 1943
Spilarctia subtestacea (Rothschild, 1910)
casigneta species group
Spilarctia adumbrata (Thomas, 1994)
Spilarctia borneensis (Rothschild, 1910)
Spilarctia casigneta (Kollar, [1844])
Spilarctia fumida (Wileman, 1910)
Spilarctia roseata (Rothschild, 1910)
Spilarctia rubilinea (Moore, [1866])
Spilarctia rufofusca (Thomas, 1994)
Spilarctia sagittifera Moore, 1888
Spilarctia sinica Daniel, 1943
Spilarctia tamangi (Thomas, 1994)
Spilarctia variata Daniel, 1943
Spilarctia xanthogaster (Thomas, 1994)
Spilarctia xanthogastes Fang, 2000
Spilarctia xanthosoma (Roepke, 1954)
hypogopa species group
Spilarctia daltonica (Černý, 2011)
Spilarctia hypogopa (Hampson, 1907)
Spilarctia flavorubida Dubatolov, 2006
Spilarctia moorei Snellen, 1879
Spilarctia philippina Dubatolov & Kishida, 2006
Spilarctia postrubida (Wileman, 1910)
leopardina species group
Spilarctia inayatullahi Dubatolov & Gurko, 2004
Spilarctia leopardina (Kollar, 1844)
Spilarctia melanostigma (Erschoff, 1872)
lutea species group
Spilarctia lutea (Hufnagel, 1766)
Spilarctia seriatopunctata (Motschulsky, [1861])
nydia species group
Spilarctia nydia Butler, 1875
Spilarctia semperi (Rothschild, 1910)
obliqua species group
Spilarctia montana (Guérin-Ménéville in Delesserte, 1843)
Spilarctia obliqua (Walker, 1855)
punctata species group
Spilarctia caloscopium (Černý, 2011)
Spilarctia congruenta (Thomas, [1993])
Spilarctia denigrata (Thomas, [1993])
Spilarctia gopara (Moore, [1860])
Spilarctia hosei (Rothschild, 1910)
Spilarctia kareli (Thomas, [1993])
Spilarctia mahaplaga (Černý, 2011)
Spilarctia murzini Dubatolov, 2005
Spilarctia percellens (Thomas, [1993])
Spilarctia phaea (Hampson, 1901)
Spilarctia procedra (Swinhoe, 1907)
Spilarctia punctata (Moore, 1859)
Spilarctia siberuta Dubatolov, 2006
Spilarctia thomasi (Holloway, 1988)
Spilarctia ummera Swinhoe, [1890]
Spilarctia ummeroides (Černý, 2011)
Spilarctia virgulae (Černý, 2011)
unplaced to species group
Spilarctia adelphus (Rothschild, 1920)
Spilarctia adriani (De Vos & Suhartawan, 2011)
Spilarctia alba (Bremer & Grey, 1853)
Spilarctia alberti (Rothschild, 1914)
Spilarctia albicornis (Hampson, 1900)
Spilarctia arctichroa (Druce, 1909)
Spilarctia ardens (Kishida, 1987)
Spilarctia aurocostata (Oberthür, 1911)
Spilarctia baltazarae (Černý, 1995)
Spilarctia biagi (Bethune-Baker, 1908)
Spilarctia bifascia Hampson, 1891
Spilarctia bifasciata Butler, 1881
Spilarctia bipunctata Daniel, 1943
Spilarctia brechlini (Černý, 2011)
Spilarctia brunnea (Heylaerts, 1890)
Spilarctia cadioui Thomas, 1989
Spilarctia cajetani (Rothschild, 1910)
Spilarctia castanea (Hampson, 1893)
Spilarctia chuanxina C.-L. Fang, 1982
Spilarctia cinnamomea (De Vos & Suhartawan, 2011)
Spilarctia clava (Wileman, 1910)
Spilarctia coccinea (Hampson, 1907)
Spilarctia comma (Walker, 1856)
Spilarctia contaminata (Wileman, 1910)
Spilarctia coorgensis Kirti & Gill, 2010
Spilarctia costata (Boisduval, 1832)
Spilarctia dinawa (Bethune-Baker, 1904)
Spilarctia dohertyi (Rothschild, 1910)
Spilarctia dukouensis C.-L. Fang, 1982
Spilarctia eldorado (Rothschild, 1910)
Spilarctia enarotali (De Vos & Suhartawan, 2011)
Spilarctia extirpata (Černý, 2009)
Spilarctia fidelia (Černý, 2011)
Spilarctia fraterna (Rothschild, 1910
Spilarctia gianellii (Oberthür, 1911)
Spilarctia grandimacula (De Vos & Suhartawan, 2011)
Spilarctia hampsoni (Joicey & Talbot, 1916)
Spilarctia harlequina (Černý, 2011)
Spilarctia hetera (Černý, 2009)
Spilarctia holobrunnea (Joicey & Talbot in Joicey, Noakes & Talbot, 1916)
Spilarctia hypsoides (Rothschild, 1914)
Spilarctia inexpectata (Rothschild, 1933)
Spilarctia irregularis (Rothschild, 1910)
Spilarctia javana (Rothschild, 1910)
Spilarctia kebea (Bethune-Baker, 1904)
Spilarctia leopoldi (Tams, 1935)
Spilarctia longiramia (Hampson, 1901)
Spilarctia mastrigti (De Vos & Suhartawan, 2011)
Spilarctia metaxantha (Hampson, 1901)
Spilarctia mona (Swinhoe, 1885)
Spilarctia motuonica C.-L. Fang, 1982
Spilarctia nana (De Vos & Suhartawan, 2011)
Spilarctia nigrovittatus (Matsumura, 1911)
Spilarctia nobilis (Turner, 1940)
Spilarctia novaeguineae (Rothschild, 1913)
Spilarctia oberthueri (Semper, 1899)
Spilarctia obliquizonata (Miyake, 1910)
Spilarctia owgarra (Bethune-Baker, 1908)
Spilarctia pallidivena (Černý, 2009)
Spilarctia persimilis (Rothschild, 1914)
Spilarctia postbrunnea (De Vos & Suhartawan, 2011)
Spilarctia pratti (Bethune-Baker, 1904)
Spilarctia quercii (Oberthür, 1911)
Spilarctia reticulata (Rothschild, 1933)
Spilarctia rhodius (Rothschild, 1920)
Spilarctia rostagnoi (Oberthür, 1911)
Spilarctia rubribasis (Joicey & Talbot in Joicey, Noakes & Talbot, 1916)
Spilarctia ruficosta (Joicey & Talbot in Joicey, Noakes & Talbot, 1916)
Spilarctia semialbescens (Talbot, 1929)
Spilarctia sparsalis (Walker, [1865])
Spilarctia styx (Bethune-Baker, 1910)
Spilarctia subcarnea (Walker, 1855)
Spilarctia tengchongensis Fang & Cao, 1984
Spilarctia terminicomma (Černý, 2009)
Spilarctia tigrina (Moore, 1879)
Spilarctia todara (Moore, 1872)
Spilarctia toxopei (Roepke, 1954)
Spilarctia transversa (De Vos & Suhartawan, 2011)
Spilarctia vandepolli (Rothschild, 1910)
Spilarctia venata (Wileman, 1915)
Spilarctia victorina (Černý, 2011)
Spilarctia vulgaris (De Vos & Suhartawan, 2011)
Spilarctia wernerthomasi (De Vos & Suhartawan, 2011)
Spilarctia whiteheadi (Rothschild, 1910)
Spilarctia wilemani (Rothschild, 1914)
Spilarctia yukikoae Kishida, 1995
Spilarctia zhangmuna C.-L. Fang, 1982

Subgenus Rhodareas Kirby, 1892
Spilarctia melanopsis (Walker, [1865])

Subgenus Praephragmatobia Dubatolov & Y. Kishida, 2010
cervina species group
Spilarctia cervina (Wallengren, 1860)
Spilarctia griseabrunnea (Holloway, 1976)
Spilarctia rubescens (Walker, 1855)
philippinica species group
Spilarctia mindanao Dubatolov & Y. Kishida, 2010
Spilarctia mollis (Černý, 2011)
Spilarctia palawana Dubatolov & Y. Kishida, 2010
Spilarctia philippinica Dubatolov & Kishida, 2010
strigatula species group
Spilarctia gurkoi Dubatolov & Y. Kishida, 2010
Spilarctia strigatula (Walker, 1855)
sumatrana species group
Spilarctia continentalis (Rothschild, 1910)
Spilarctia sumatrana (Swinhoe, 1905)

Taxonomy
Spilarctia species are often included in Spilosoma.

References

 , 1953: Neue Heterocera-Arten und -Formen. Mitteilungen der Münchner Entomologischen Gesellschaft, 43: 252- 261..
 , 1955: Beiträge zur Kenntnis der Arctiidae Ostasiens unter besonderer Berücksichtigung der Ausbeute von Dr. h. c. H. Höne aus diesem Gebiet (IV. Teil: Nachträge). Bonn Zoological Bulletin, 6 (1-2): 132-145.
 , 1961: Spilarctia karakorumica sp. n. (Lepidoptera: Arctiidae). Mitteilungen der Münchner Entomologischen Gesellschaft 51: 159.
 , 2005: Review of the subspecies of Spilarctia leopardina (Kollar, 1844) (Lepidoptera: Arctiidae). Atalanta 36 (1-2): 180-188.
 , 2005: Description of new taxa of tiger moths from China, with some synonymic notes (Lepidoptera: Arctiidae). Atalanta 36 (3/4): 526-537.
 , 2006: New Spilarctia species from Western Indonesia (Lepidoptera: Arctiidae). Atalanta 37 (3/4): 399-407.
 , 2007: New tiger moth taxa from Eurasia. (Lepidoptera: Arctiidae). Atalanta 38 (3-4): 351-359.
 , 2010: Tiger-moths of Eurasia (Lepidoptera, Arctiidae) (Nyctemerini by ). Neue Entomologische Nachrichten 65: 1-106, Marktleuthen.
 , 2006: Review of the Spilarctia hypogopagroup, with descriptions of a new species and two new subspecies (Lepidoptera: Arctiidae). Atalanta 37 (3/4): 393-398.
 , 2010: Praephragmatobia gen. nov., a new subgenus of the Spilarctia strigatula group, with a preliminary review of species (Lepidoptera: Arctiidae). Tinea 21 (2): 98-111.
 , 1982: Four new species of the genus Spilarctia from West China (Lepidoptera: Arctiidae). Acta Entomologica Sinica 25 (2): 201-203.
 , 1997: New discovered tiger moths from the Asian Palaearctic fauna (Lepidoptera: Arctiidae: Arctiinae). Linneana Belgica 16 (1): 49-60.
 , 1988: Three new species and some synonymic notes on the Arctiidae from Japan, Taiwan and Philippines. Tyô to Ga 39 (2): 99-118.
 , 2010: Studies on external genitalia of seven Indian species of the genus Spilarctia Butler (Lepidoptera: Arctiidae: Arctiinae) along with the description of a new species. Journal of Threatened Taxa 2 (6): 948-960.
 , 2011: Lymantriinae and Arctiinae - Including Phylogeny and Check List of the Quadrifid Noctuoidea of Europe. Noctuidae Europaeae 13: 1-448.

 
Spilosomina
Moth genera